ABC 8 may refer to one of the following television stations in the United States affiliated with the American Broadcasting Company:

Current affiliates
KAIT in Jonesboro, Arkansas
KGNS-DT2 in Laredo, Texas
KIFI-TV in Idaho Falls, Idaho
KJCT-LP in Grand Junction/Montrose, Colorado
KJUD in Juneau, Alaska
KLKN in Lincoln, Nebraska
KNOE-DT2 in Monroe, Louisiana
KOLO-TV in Reno, Nevada
KSBW-DT2 in Salinas/Monterey/Santa Cruz, California
KTUL-TV in Tulsa, Oklahoma
WCHS-TV in Charleston/Huntington, West Virginia
WDAZ-TV in Devils Lake/Grand Forks, North Dakota
Semi-satellite of WDAY-TV, Fargo, North Dakota
WFAA-TV in Dallas/Fort Worth, Texas
WGTQ in Sault Ste. Marie, Michigan
Full satellite of WGTU, Traverse City, Michigan
WMTW in Poland Spring/ Portland, Maine
WQAD-TV in Moline, Illinois (Quad Cities)
WRIC-TV in Petersburg/Richmond, Virginia
WTNH in New Haven/Hartford, Connecticut

Formerly affiliated
 KFWU (now KQSL) in Fort Bragg, California (1990 to 1997)
Was a satellite of KRCR-TV in Redding, California
KGW-TV in Portland, Oregon (1956 to 1959)
KJCT (now KLML) in Grand Junction, Colorado (1979 to 2014)
KKTU/KDEV in Cheyenne, Wyoming (branded as ABC 8 from 2003 to 2006 and again in 2008)
KGHL-TV/KPAX-TV in Missoula, Montana (1970 to 1991; secondary from 1970–1976 and 1984–1991)
KOMU-TV in Columbia/Jefferson City, Missouri (secondary from 1953 to 1971, then primarily from 1982 to 1985)
KULR-TV in Billings, Montana (1963 to 1987)
KVIJ-TV in Sayre, Oklahoma (1976 to 1992)
Was a satellite of KVII-TV in Amarillo, Texas
WGHP in High Point, Greensboro and Winston-Salem, North Carolina (1963 to 1995)
WISH-TV in Indianapolis, Indiana (1954 to 1956)
WSIX (now WKRN-TV) in Nashville, Tennessee (1953 to 1973)
WSLA (now WAKA) in Montgomery, Alabama (1960 to 1968)
WSVI in Christiansted, U.S. Virgin Islands (1965 to 2015)
WTVH (now WHOI) in Peoria, Illinois (1953 to 1963)
WVUE-TV in New Orleans, Louisiana (1970 to 1995)